Haddiscoe railway station (formerly Haddiscoe Low Level) is on the Wherry Lines in Norfolk, England, named after the village of Haddiscoe, some  distant, although the village of St Olaves on the other side of the River Waveney is closer. Its three-letter station code is HAD.

It is managed by Greater Anglia, which also operates all trains serving the station. Haddiscoe station is remote, positioned as it is at the end of a minor road, though it does have a car park.

History
An earlier Haddiscoe station was opened by the Norfolk Railway in 1847 but was later closed by the Great Eastern Railway in 1904. It was replaced by this station, originally named Haddiscoe Low Level, at the junction of the Wherry Line and the now closed Yarmouth-Beccles Line from London to Yarmouth.

An existing station on the Yarmouth-Beccles Line at this junction was renamed from Herringfleet Junction to Haddiscoe High Level at the same time.

Both the High Level station and the Low Level station operated until the British Transport Commission withdrew services on the Yarmouth line in 1959 and closed the associated High Level station. British Railways subsequently renamed the remaining station Haddiscoe.

A link between the two lines existed, controlled by Haddiscoe Junction signal box. In 1961,the signal box was preserved in the transport gallery at the Science Museum, Kensington, where it was adapted to display various kinds of signalling equipment. In 1995 it was moved to the Mangapps Railway Museum.

Services
 the typical Monday-Saturday off-peak service at Haddiscoe is as follows:

References

 Ordnance Survey (2005). OS Explorer Map OL40 - The Broads. .

External links 

 Mangapps Railway Museum

Railway stations in Norfolk
DfT Category F2 stations
Former Great Eastern Railway stations
Greater Anglia franchise railway stations
Railway stations in Great Britain opened in 1904